Jay Moore (born August 16, 1983) is a former American football defensive end for the Omaha Nighthawks of the United Football League. He was drafted by the San Francisco 49ers in the fourth round in the 2007 NFL Draft. Moore was also a member of the St. Louis Rams and Tennessee Titans. He played college football for the Nebraska Cornhuskers.

Moore is current a radio host for Hail Varsity Radio, a sports talk show aired on several AM radio stations in Nebraska.

Early career
Moore attended Elkhorn High School in Elkhorn, Nebraska. In High School Moore played tailback and linebacker. He was a member of the Omaha World-Herald's Super Six team, Moore registered 92 carries for 822 yards (8.9 avg) and scored 16 touchdowns in five games. He rushed for 1,742 yards and 31 touchdowns (8.8 avg) in 2000

College career
In 37 games at the University of Nebraska in Lincoln of which he played in, 30 were games that he was a starter. He had 103 tackles, 12 sacks, 8 passes defensed, four forced fumbles, three fumble recoveries, and one interception. His 38 career tackles behind the line of scrimmage tied Mike Rucker (1995–99) for sixth on the University of Nebraska's all-time record list.

Professional career

Pre-draft measurables

San Francisco 49ers
On September 1, 2007, Moore was placed on the San Francisco 49ers' injured reserve list after suffering a severe high-ankle sprain in the final game of the pre-season.

Moore is recovered from the high ankle sprain that cost him his whole rookie year.

St. Louis Rams
Moore was signed to the St. Louis Rams practice squad on September 30, 2009.

Tennessee Titans
After his contract with the Rams expired at the end of the season, Moore signed a future contract with the Tennessee Titans on January 13, 2010. He was cut on July 9, 2010.

Dallas Cowboys
Moore agreed to sign with Dallas on July 23, 2010. However, the next day, he decided that he did not want to play football and backed out of the deal. He was never officially signed.

References

External links
Just Sports Stats
United Football League bio

1983 births
Living people
Sportspeople from Omaha, Nebraska
Players of American football from Nebraska
American football defensive ends
American football linebackers
Nebraska Cornhuskers football players
San Francisco 49ers players
St. Louis Rams players
Tennessee Titans players
Omaha Nighthawks players